Brigadier General Gilberto Landeros Briseño is second in command (under General Alfonso Duarte Múgica) of the second military region in Tijuana. He served in the military unit combatting organized crime groups such as the Tijuana Cartel and the Sinaloa Cartel. In 2019 he was approved as Police chief and he works in Hermosilloen 2022 se le asignó el cargo como secretario de seguridad pública del estado de Baja California

References 

Mexican generals
People of the Mexican Drug War
Year of birth missing (living people)
Living people